Flunk Punk Rumble, known in Japan as , is a Japanese manga series written and illustrated by Miki Yoshikawa. It was serialized in Kodansha's shōnen manga magazine Weekly Shōnen Magazine from October 2006 to May 2011, with its chapters collected in 23 tankōbon volumes. The manga was released in English by Chuang Yi in Singapore; only three volumes were released. 

A 10-episode television drama adaptation was broadcast from April to June 2010. A crossover anime short with Yoshikawa's other series, Yamada-kun and the Seven Witches, titled Yamada-kun to 7-nin no Majo x Yankee-kun to Megane-chan, was released in August 2015.

Plot
Daichi Shinagawa was just a yankī (Japanese term for delinquent) who wanted nothing to do with his high school life. Hana Adachi, the dedicated class representative, however would not allow it and constantly bothers him to be involved in school life. Shinagawa is first confused on why she keeps pestering him until he discovers her secret. While she may look like a typical class representative stereotype, Adachi is actually not very smart and lacks common sense, and Shinagawa eventually learns that Adachi is a former delinquent. Regretting being a yankee during her middle school years, Adachi decides to change her ways to achieve her dream of becoming the best class representative. She decides to help Shinagawa so he will not continue to make the same mistake that she did. Thus begins the adventures of these two unlikely friends and their classmates at Mon Shiro High School.

Characters

Main characters

Also known as "Yankee-kun", Shinagawa is a short-tempered delinquent who does not like to be bothered and has no plans for his high school life. That is until he meets Adachi, a former delinquent who convinces him to change his path else he might regret it like she did, which he is not aware until seeing how his rivals get afraid when they know Hana. At first he is merely pestered by Adachi into becoming more active in school, but gradually changes throughout the series: from small things such as not smoking and avoiding class to even becoming the student council's co-vice president. He hates to study but is pretty good in math. He is also an honorable person who will try everything to protect others, becoming an integral member in his newfound group of friends.
 His mother is a lawyer while his father, whose personality is similar to his, is a renowned doctor. Later in the series, it is revealed that he was one of the top students in a reputable private middle school. He was kicked out of the school after fighting the delinquents who were bothering his number one rival in studies, . Although he made a promise with Shizuku to meet again in university, his grades had already begun to slip, eventually losing interest in studies entirely and subsequently becoming a student with poor grades. This event marks his becoming a delinquent and his changed look (he previously had black hair and wore glasses).
 He initially has a love-hate relationship with Hana Adachi, liking her due to her nature to help others no matter what, but becoming annoyed with her due to her idiocy, lack of common sense, and forcing him to help with her bizarre plans and antics. In a bonus chapter, it is shown that Shinagawa decided to attend Mon Shiro only after seeing a beautiful girl, who was actually Adachi without glasses and with loose hair (something he did not realize until much later), at his entrance exam. Although he always bicker with Adachi, he would do anything so that he will not hurt or upset her. He later admits to liking her and even gets jealous when her former middle school classmate tells Shinagawa his intentions to ask her out, but Adachi remains oblivious to Shinagawa's feelings.
He gets accepted into a prestigious university and four years after their high school graduation, he is shown to be teaching at Mon Shiro. However, he is also found to live with Hana later, and thus making his friends to believe Hana is his housewife, something he and Hana deny. It is the time when he tries to keep Hana's identity, that he finds out she is the girl who was actually Adachi without glasses and with loose hair before.
In anime version of Miki Yoshikawa's other work, Yamada-kun and the Seven Witches episode 2 of the OVA and episodes 3 and 7, Daichi appears as cameos with voice provided by Yūki Ono. He also appears in the crossover Yankee-kun na Yamada-kun to Megane-chan to Majo, but with the body-swap of Ryu Yamada.

Adachi is the class representative and later, the student council president. Despite her appearance as the quiet and dutiful class rep, she lacks common sense and often has the worst grades in class. Having been a delinquent before attending high school (to the point that she was even held back a year), she initially does not know how to interact with normal students so she hangs around Shinagawa, forcing him to be more active in school. Since she desires to be a normal student, Adachi tries not to use her monstrous fighting abilities and had even changed her appearance; she ties her hair in pigtails and wears glasses despite having great eyesight. When she starts attending school without glasses and pigtails, her popularity among the student body skyrockets, but after mistakenly believing that Shinagawa's father took her for a delinquent, she goes back to wearing them.
Not much is known about her past besides her status as a fearsome delinquent during middle school, with the mention of her name striking fear in anyone who knows her reputation. She is even shown to have influence over Yakuza gangsters. Also, it is mentioned that she left her main residence in order to live with her grandma, who is itself not much different to Hana. However, after being accepted into a high profile university, she decides to go back home despite the consequences that might befall her. According to her grandma, she did this for Shinagawa's sake. She reappears to Shinagawa four years later as a transfer student in Mon Shiro since she officially dropped out of school before she could graduate.
She is later found to have lived with Daichi, and thus his friends mistake her as Daichi's housewife, which is denied by Daichi and herself.
She also makes an appearance in anime version of Miki Yoshikawa's other work, Yamada-kun and the Seven Witches episode 2 of the OVA.

 A tall, bespectacled, fearsome-looking student with a noticeable scar extending across his forehead and left eyebrow. His normal stare appears fearsome to most despite in reality he is a bit childish and cowardice, which had led to him becoming a hikikomori a week after he got into trouble with a gang. Adachi and Shinagawa beat the gang (without knowing they themselves were the cause of his self-isolation) which allows him to overcome his fears. Adachi tries to get him to attend school and take the exams, but he refuses, saying he is afraid of sitting next to Shinagawa, when in reality he is merely looking for Adachi's attention. Shinagawa tells him to attend school and take the exams or she will never visit him again. He is very smart, almost always scoring a 100 on a test, and becomes the student council's treasurer. He has a crush on Makoto which seems obvious to everyone around him except for Makoto. After the four-year time skip, the two are shown to be a couple.

 Adachi's kohai from middle school who transfers into Mon Shiro and becomes the student council's secretary. Known as "The Bloody Pantheress", she was a Yankee and Hana's right hand man back in middle school. She is still very devoted to Adachi, and has been ever since Adachi saved her and they became friends. While Adachi has reformed herself to become a good student, Himeji on the other hand still acts like a delinquent and initially believes that Chiba and Shinagawa are her subordinates. She has a bad relationship with her family because she is adopted, and when she told them that she wanted to transfer, they kicked her out of their home. She starts living with Adachi after the latter finds out about her situation. Though she is antagonistic towards Shinagawa at first, she eventually develops a crush for him. After the four-year time skip, she is shown to be learning her family's business, the famous Himeji Corporation.
Surprisingly, she is interested in and is good at household chores, always shown to be cleaning around the group.

 Izumi is an honor student who runs against Adachi for the student council president position. Like Adachi, he is a former delinquent who changed himself in order to focus more on his studies, with his grades ranking second in the entire grade. He was known as a legendary fighter during his biker gang days so Izumi considers himself number one in fighting already. Though he is the first person in the manga shown to be capable of blocking Adachi's kick (using all his might), he still lost to her swiftly. He decides to become the vice president instead after losing to her in a fight. He shares his position with Shinagawa resulting in the two often fighting over who is the better vice president. He gets really hyped up over the smallest things and still loves to wear his old gang outfit. He is shown to be sensitive about his short height, being the shortest male of the group, only barely taller than the girls. Four years later, he is shown to be studying law.

Other Mon Shiro students

 A classmate of Shinagawa and Adachi. She is one of the few girls that talks to Shinagawa without being afraid of him. She is dating Sagami, a student from another school.

 A student in Shinagawa's year who stopped going to school after her childhood friend got a girlfriend. She remained at home and immersed herself in online gaming. When her childhood friend got worried and asked the student council to help her, they initially thought she was a boy because her game avatar was male. She becomes good friends with the student council members after convincing her to go back to school. It is mentioned that she still occasionally plays the online game with Shinagawa. She is shown to be a very outgoing type of girl and is unaware that Chiba has since developed a crush on her.

 Kumagaya's childhood friend who is concerned about her playing games and not attending school. She was upset that she would lose him as he grew apart and started having interest in girls, leading to her behavior.

 A third-year student and the former student council president who is always seen with a fan in his hand. A seemingly easy-going person, Akita is a former delinquent who will fly in a rage upon being called a girl. When he is in this state, even Shinagawa and Izumi fear him. It is shown that the only way to get him to calm down is for a girl to kick him in his private parts. Akita's girlfriend is Shinagawa's older sister and they both attend the same university.

 A student who transfers into Mon Shiro solely to be in the student council, which he believes is a bōsōzoku (biker gang) because his former boss Izumi is in it. He later runs for student council president hoping to make Mon Shiro the strongest. After becoming president he is surprised to find that, while the rest of the student council are under the impression that Adachi does nothing, she in fact keeps detailed records of every single student that attends Mon Shiro, keeping special tabs on those students who are in danger of expulsion so that she can help them to enjoy school life as she has. She entrusts him with these duties, telling him that he will be able to handle it because he has his friends there to help him, just like her friends have helped her.

 A second-year delinquent who just wants to make friends, but is unable to come off friendly. Though he and Kagawa get into a fight on the first day of the year, they become good friends. He runs for student council vice president alongside Anna in hopes of making more friends. He and his group eventually win the election after their rival candidates concede. After the school's sports festival, he develops a crush on Anna. In an attempt to get to know her better he, Kagawa, and Anna begin a tradition of going to an ice cream shop together after school each day.
 and 
 First introduced as a part of Shinagawa's trash team during the festival. "Guy-gals" that are never apart, Nacchi and Macchi idolize Shinagawa. They later run for the secretary and treasurer positions in the student council believing they are Shinagawa's successors. After winning the election, they are shocked and dismayed to find that all the paper work for the student council is done solely by their positions, previously held by Chiba and Himeji.

 She first appears as an air head who loves hair and makeup retaking a test alone with Shinagawa as the test proctor. Later on, they discover she won a medal for her cheerleading skills and eventually helps them practice for the sports festival. Though her teaching is effective in the long run, she is prone to kicking and punching if anyone is to interrupt her. She eventually becomes student council vice president along with Kitami.

 A weak-bodied punk rocker girl selected as the class representative for the culture festival alongside Shinagawa. She rarely came to class due to her condition until Shinagawa convinced her to come to class regularly. She soon developed some feelings for him, but finds out about the girl he likes after meeting Subaru Mito. She is the one who sets up Shinagawa into seeing Adachi without her glasses and braids on, and tells him that the person he is looking for is Adachi.

 A student who runs against Kagawa for the president position during the student council elections. His father is mentioned to be a famous politician. To most people he appears as a modest and charming student with good grades and influence, but in truth he is a former delinquent whose goal is to remove all other delinquents from Mon Shiro (except his team candidates). He and his fellow candidates fools the students into making them believe that they have nothing to with the dirty campaign against Kagawa's group and even manipulates Adachi and her group. After getting beaten by Adachi and realizing who she is, they stop their dirty tactics and concede to Kagawa's group. Since then, he has been on good terms with the other characters, even helping them out.

 An entertainer and student who runs for vice president during the student council elections. She has the second best grades in her year. Like her fellow candidates, Kashiwa is a former delinquent. She reconciles with their opponents after being beaten by Adachi.

 A model and student who runs for vice president alongside Kashiwa during the student council elections. He has the third best grades in his year. Like his fellow candidates, Aizu is a former delinquent. He reconciles with their opponents after being beaten by Adachi.
Computer Club Boys
 Two geek students in the computer club who first appeared during the student council's attempt to get Makoto out of the gaming world. They depend on Shinagawa guarding from delinquents when they walk outside of school. Shinagawa trains them to be more confident so that they no longer have to depend on him. However, even though they shock the entire school with their cool and confident looks, they are beaten back to their wimpy selves by a delinquent who was not fazed by their new looks, forcing Shinagawa to help them yet again. Izumi then tells Shinagawa that to them Shinagawa is not a bodyguard but a friend.

Other characters

 Daichi's former classmate and once an arch-rival, but after Daichi is kicked out from school, she has always kept and hoped to reunite with Daichi. She is disappointed with the fall of Daichi but nonetheless still keeps believing on him.

 A delinquent from the all-boys Ageha Technical High School. He first appears when he and his gang try to find Shinagawa at his high school after having a fight with him. Adachi helps Shinagawa escape but were soon found by Sagami's gang. Adachi attacks him when he harasses her, and when the gang realizes who she is, they flee in terror. He is dating Kasukabe thanks to Adachi helping him confess his feeling for Kasukabe, on the condition that he cleans up his act in the future.

 Shinagawa's childhood friend who attends the same school as Sagami. He finds ugly girls attractive and gets into trouble with the yakuza after unknowingly dating a gangster's wife online. He is secretly saved from this situation by Adachi. He is revealed to be the strongest of the Big Four.

 A hotheaded but honest teenage girl whose attitude is reminiscent of Shinagawa. Adachi and Shinagawa meet her when her father asks them take money to her at the Shibuya District so that she can come home to celebrate New Year's with her family. She instead prefers to stay with her friend Misora who is only hanging with her for her money. Oomiya did not mind this since Misora made her "cool". When the money given by Oomiya's father is no longer enough for Misora, and Misora fails to use Adachi for more money, she has Oomiya kidnapped and sold into a prostitution ring at a Love hotel. Oomiya is saved by Adachi and agrees to go home to her father with Adachi and Shinagawa.

 Shinagawa's older sister. She and her brother share the same lazy, stubborn, and brutally honest attitude, but Kairi tends to be a bit nicer than her brother. Her boyfriend is Akita, the former student council president. After finding out about the university that Shinagawa plans to enter, Kairi decides to take the exam to transfer into the same university since she does not want to be the odd one out in the family as their parents are also graduates of said university.

 Adachi's delinquent younger brother and boss of the Big Four in Ageha Technical High School, and having only one eye to see for some reasons. Like Adachi, You has excellent fighting abilities and is capable of taking on the boys of Mon Shiro's Student Council on his own. However, unlike his sister, You is an all-around genius. He both fears and admires his sister, and his goal was to conquer the nation with her, but she had left the main house and put her delinquent days behind her. He too leaves home and attempts to live with Adachi, but after she refuses, he starts living with Shinagawa, whose family comes to accept him as their own. He still lives with them even after the four-year time skip.

 The Student Council Secretary at  whose appearance and strength is strikingly similar to Adachi's. Shinigawa mistakes her for the girl that he met during his entrance exams at Mon Shiro. Subaru comes to like him and tells him that she knows the identity of that girl, eventually telling Miyagi Sakura that that girl has always been by his side. In order for her to not be mistaken as Adachi again, she cuts her hair short.

Media

Manga

Written and illustrated by Miki Yoshikawa, Flunk Punk Rumble started as a three-part one-shot story published in Kodansha's shōnen manga magazine Weekly Shōnen Magazine from June 21 to July 5, 2006;  it was later developed into a full series, published in the same magazine from October 18, 2006, to May 18, 2011. Kodansha collected its chapters in 23 tankōbon volumes, released from February 16, 2007, to June 17, 2011.

The manga was released in English by Chuang Yi in Singapore. Three volumes were published from March 4, 2008, to January 20, 2009.

Drama
A 10-episode television drama adaptation was broadcast on TBS from April 23 to June 25, 2010.

Other media
A crossover one-shot chapter with Fairy Tail, titled , was published in Weekly Shōnen Magazine on November 19, 2008, and released in the 11th volume of the manga.

An official guidebook was released by Kodansha on March 17, 2010. includes detailed information about the characters and production of the series, illustrations, and an interview between Yoshikawa and Hiro Mashima, for whom Yoshikawa previously worked as an assistant.

A crossover anime short with Yoshikawa's other series, Yamada-kun and the Seven Witches, titled , was included on the first DVD and Blu-ray Disc box sets of the Yamada-kun and the Seven Witches anime television series, released on August 26, 2015.

References

External links
 Kodansha's official Yankee-kun to Megane-chan manga website 
  
 

2010 Japanese television series debuts
2010 Japanese television series endings
Japanese television dramas based on manga
Kin'yō Dorama
Kodansha manga
Romantic comedy anime and manga
Shōnen manga
Yankī anime and manga